"New Kind of Medicine" is a 1998 song by American recording artist Ultra Naté, released as the third single from her third album, Situation: Critical (1998). The radio version was remixed by British production team D'Influence. It was a top 20 hit in Scotland and the UK, and a top 30 hit in Iceland. On the Eurochart Hot 100, it reached number 42 in August 1998. A music video was also produced to promote the single.

Critical reception
J.D. Considine from The Baltimore Sun described the song as "feisty" and "Chic-style".

Track listing
 CD single, Benelux (1998)
"New Kind of Medicine" (Radio Edit) – 3:39
"New Kind of Medicine" (Extended Version) – 7:03

 CD single, UK (1998)
"New Kind of Medicine" (Radio Edit) – 3:40
"Free" (Mood II Swing Edit) – 6:54
"Found a Cure" – 6:09

 CD maxi, Scandinavia (1998)
"New Kind of Medicine" (Radio Edit) – 3:36
"New Kind of Medicine" (Extended) – 7:02
"New Kind of Medicine" (Morales Club Mix) – 9:50
"New Kind of Medicine" (Tenaglia's Future Garage Mix) – 6:43

Charts

References

1998 singles
1998 songs
Ultra Naté songs
AM PM Records singles
Strictly Rhythm singles
Nu-disco songs